İbrahim Çolak (born 7 January 1995) is a Turkish male artistic gymnast, representing his nation at international competitions.

At the 2013 Mediterranean Games in Mersin, Turkey, Çolak won the silver medal, his country's first medal in the Mediterranean Games. He competed at world championships, including the 2014 World Artistic Gymnastics Championships in Nanning, China. He won the bronze medal in the rings event at the 2015 European Games in Baku, Azerbaijan. Çolak became silver medalist in the still rings event at the 2018 European Championships in Glasgow, Scotland. He captured the gold medal in the 2018 Mediterranean Games in Tarragona, Spain. In the 2019 World Artistic Gymnastics Championships held in Stuttgart, Germany,  he won the gold medal in still rings, the first gold and first medal for Turkey in world championships.

References

External links
Ibrahim Colak at FIG

1995 births
Living people
Turkish male artistic gymnasts
Place of birth missing (living people)
Gymnasts at the 2015 European Games
Gymnasts at the 2019 European Games
European Games bronze medalists for Turkey
European Games medalists in gymnastics
Competitors at the 2013 Mediterranean Games
Universiade medalists in gymnastics
Competitors at the 2018 Mediterranean Games
Mediterranean Games silver medalists for Turkey
Mediterranean Games gold medalists for Turkey
Mediterranean Games medalists in gymnastics
Universiade silver medalists for Turkey
Medalists at the 2017 Summer Universiade
Medalists at the 2019 Summer Universiade
World champion gymnasts
European champions in gymnastics
Gymnasts at the 2020 Summer Olympics
Olympic gymnasts of Turkey
Gymnasts at the 2022 Mediterranean Games
21st-century Turkish people